Henry van Wart (1784 - 1873), an American who became British by special act of Parliament, founded the Birmingham Stock Exchange and served as one of Birmingham's first aldermen and a director of the Birmingham Banking Company.

He was married to Sarah Irving, the sister of author Washington Irving. They had four children: William (1812 - 1868), Matilda (b. 1814), Marianne (b. 1816). and George (b. 1817; later a wine merchant). William later named his first- born Washington Irving Van Wart (b. 1836), whose niece in turn was called Rosalinda Irving Van Wart (b. 1874).

Henry and Sarah met when he was employed by her family's New York City company, Irving & Smith, and they moved to England when he was tasked with opening a Liverpool branch of the firm.

After that enterprise failed, they moved to Birmingham, and he set up a profitable business, exporting the city's goods to America.

Washington Irving lived with the van Warts at four of their homes in Birmingham, light-heartedly christening two of these buildings "Castle van Tromp" and writing some of his most successful stories at them.

He is also known to have worshipped at St Paul's Church in St Paul's Square, Birmingham.

Van Wart developed a friendship with Louisiana businessman Frederick W. Tilton, who became Van Wart's agent in New Orleans. Tilton endowed the library at Tulane University.

Henry Van Wart was also great friends with fellow American Samuel Aspinwall Goddard, US Consul to Birmingham. Goddard's uncle was also Thomas Aspinwall (consul) United States consul to London, 1816–1854. Goddard was a Gunmaker, LBSC director, owner of the Church "Surprise" railway locomotive 1840; author and pamphleteer; exhibitor of guns at Great Exhibition 1851; co-patentee with Dr. William Church (inventor) of a breech-loading canon presented to the British parliamentary ordinance committee in 1853. Samuel A. Goddard also named his daughter Emily Van Wart Goddard after Henry Van Wart.

External links
The van Warts and Irving, in Birmingham
Birmingham Steam Buses 1834-1910

1784 births
1873 deaths
Businesspeople from New York City
Councillors in Birmingham, West Midlands
American people of Dutch descent
British people of Dutch descent
19th-century American businesspeople